Rich may refer to:

Common uses
 Rich, an entity possessing wealth
 Rich, an intense flavor,  color, sound, texture, or feeling
Rich (wine), a descriptor in wine tasting

Places

United States 
 Rich, Mississippi, an unincorporated community
 Rich County, Utah
 Rich Mountain (disambiguation)
 Rich Township, Cook County, Illinois
 Rich Township, Anderson County, Kansas
 Rich Township, Lapeer County, Michigan

Elsewhere 
 Er-Rich, Morocco, a town
 Rich River, Victoria, Australia

People 
 Rich (given name), often short for Richard
 Rich (surname)

Arts, entertainment, and media

Fictional characters
 DS Terry Rich, a character in the British soap opera EastEnders
 Rich, a character in the American sitcom television series The Hogan Family
 Rich Halke, a character in the TV sitcom Step by Step
 Rich Hardbeck, a character in the British television series Skins
 Rich Millar, a character in the British soap opera Doctors
 Richie Rich (comics), a fictional character

Music
 Rich, half of the American country music duo Big & Rich
 Rich Velonskis, half of the American duo Nikki & Rich
 "Rich" (Maren Morris song), 2018
 "Rich", a song by Jawbreaker from Etc.
 "Rich", a song by K. Michelle, from More Issues Than Vogue, 2016
 "Rich", a song by Kirko Bangz, 2014
 "Rich", a song by M.I from The Chairman, 2014
 "Rich", a song by Megan Thee Stallion from Suga, 2020
 "Rich", a song by the Yeah Yeah Yeahs from Fever to Tell, 2003

Television
 "Rich" (Skins), an episode of the television series Skins

Businesses 
 B.C. Rich, guitar manufacturer
 Rich & Cowan, UK book publishing company
 Rich International Airways, former U.S. airline
 Rich Products, international food products corporation
 Rich's (department store), U.S. department store chain in the southern U.S.
 Rich's (discount store), U.S. discount store chain in the northeastern U.S.

Navy ships 
 USS Rich (DD-820), a Gearing-class destroyer in the Korean War and Vietnam War
 USS Rich (DE-695), a Buckley-class destroyer escort in World War II

Science and technology 
 Rich, in combustion engines, refers to an air-fuel ratio which has an excess amount of fuel beyond what is required for complete combustion
 Ring imaging Cherenkov detector, a particle detector

Titles 
 Baron Rich, an extinct title in the Peerage of England
 Rich baronets, four titles, three of which are extinct and one dormant

See also 
 List of people known as the Rich
 Enrichment (disambiguation)
 Species richness